Federico Eulogio Malo Andrade (5 July 1859 – 14 February 1932) was an Ecuadorian entrepreneur and financier born in Cuenca, Ecuador. He was the founder and president of Chamber of Commerce of Cuenca. He participated in the founding of the first bank of Cuenca, Banco del Azuay.

Early life and education 
Andrade was an Ecuadorian entrepreneur and prominent figure who made his living from the export of panama hats and quinine, and the foundation of financial institutions. He was born in Cuenca, on July 5, 1859, to Dr. Luis Malo Valdivieso, a lawyer and lieutenant colonel who also was a rich merchant, and Mrs. Jesús Andrade Morales, niece of the President of Ecuador, Dr. Jeronimo Carrion y Palacio. 

In 1877, he traveled to Europe to live in Paris and London, where he studied economy and law. He stayed there until 1879, and returned to Cuenca, where he was established until 1883, when he returned to Paris. He became a friend of Juan Montalvo, an Ecuadorian writer resident there. When he finally went back to Cuenca in 1887, he married Mrs. Leticia de Andrade Chiriboga (1870–1935) on March 23, 1888. They had eleven children.

Career 
Andrade became an important person in Cuenca in 1888. He was the Secretary of the City Council in 1891, a French and English teacher at Benigno Malo National College of Cuenca in 1892. He became a Congressman in 1896, Rector of Benigno Malo National College in 1896-1900,1901–1906, and 1914–1916. In the year 1903, he was appointed as President of the City Council. In 1912 he became the President of Azuay's Liberal Party, Governor of Azuay between 1916 and 1920, and Senator in 1924.

In 1912, he imported the first automobile from London. In 1913, he founded Cuenca's first Bank, Banco del Azuay, and in 1919, Cuenca's Commerce Chamber. He participated in the opening of a branch of Ecuador's Central Bank in Cuenca, in 1928, of which he became president.

Death 
Andrade died in Cuenca, Ecuador, on February 14, 1932, at the age of 72.

External links
 
 Biography of Federico Malo Andrade in Spanish

1859 births
1932 deaths
Ecuadorian businesspeople
Mayors of places in Ecuador
People from Cuenca, Ecuador
Ecuadorian expatriates in France
Ecuadorian expatriates in England